Fliede (in its upper course: Hermannswasser) is a river of Hesse, Germany. It flows into the Fulda south of the town Fulda.

See also
List of rivers of Hesse

References

Rivers of Hesse
East Hesse
Rivers of Germany